The 2010 Alabama Senate election was held on November 2, 2010. Voters in all 35 districts of the Alabama State Senate voted for their representatives. Other elections were also held on November 2. Republicans gained 9 seats, taking control of the chamber, while the Democrats lost 10 seats.

Overview

Results

District 1

District 2

District 3

District 4

District 5

District 6

District 7

District 8

District 9

District 10

District 11

District 12

District 13

District 14

District 15

District 16

District 17

District 18

District 19

District 20

District 21

District 22

District 23

District 24

District 25

District 26

District 27

District 28

District 29

District 30

District 31

District 32

District 33

District 34

District 35

References 

2010
Senate
Alabama Senate